"Sometimes I Do" is a song co-written and recorded by Canadian country artist Tyler Joe Miller. The song was co-written with Dan Swinimer, Jeffrey Darren Johnson, and Mitch Merrett. It was the fourth single off his debut extended play Sometimes I Don't, But Sometimes I Do.

Background
Miller said that the song was a "blast to write", adding "It’s about how you can’t really put me in a box. Sometimes I’m up to no good and get into a little bit of trouble and sometimes I’m as innocent as can be just havin’ a good time".

Music video
The official music video for "Sometimes I Do" premiered on October 19, 2021.

Chart performance
"Sometimes I Do" peaked at number five on the Canada Country chart for the week of November 20, 2021, marking Miller's fourth consecutive top ten hit to start his radio career. It also reached a peak of number 86 on the Canadian Hot 100 during the same week.

References

2020 songs
2021 singles
Tyler Joe Miller songs
Songs written by Mitch Merrett
Songs written by Tyler Joe Miller
Song recordings produced by Danick Dupelle